Kangyi Pagoda lies on the hill west of the vast lake east of Mudon. It was built to enshrine a Buddha's hair relic granted by Buddha as he and five hundred arahantas were going on sojourn this way on completion of eight vasas to a hermit named (Min) Maung staying there. The original was built into a higher one 40 cubits high by town mayor of Zaya.

Banya Thampi. Shin Thawna and Shin Ottara. under the reign of Thiri Dhamma Thawka Yaza. in 239. It was further rebuilt to be 89 cubits high by the nationals in 1198. Now it is 98 cubits high. with an octagonal base and 418 cubits of plinth. in the middle of a walled compound 4.62 acres. On the upper terrace are 23 pago¬das. with 50 on the middle terrace. 33 on the lower terrace and 18 on the precincts.

References

External links
 Facebook profile

Buildings and structures in Mon State
Pagodas in Myanmar
Buddhist temples in Myanmar